Leśne may refer to the following places in Poland:

Leśne Chałupy
Leśne Domki
Leśne Odpadki
Leśne Pólko
Leśne Śliwki

See also